Mass shootings occurred at drug rehabilitation centres in Irapuato, Guanajuato, Mexico, on 6 June and 1 July 2020.

On 6 June 2020, 10 men were killed at a centre.

Less than a month later, on the afternoon of 1 July, 28 people were killed and five others wounded at an unregistered centre.

References

2020 mass shootings in Mexico
2020 murders in Mexico
21st century in Guanajuato
21st-century mass murder in Mexico
Attacks on buildings and structures in 2020
Attacks on buildings and structures in Mexico
Crime in Guanajuato
Massacres
June 2020 crimes in North America
June 2020 events in Mexico
July 2020 crimes in North America
July 2020 events in Mexico
Massacres in 2020
Massacres in Mexico
Battles of the Mexican drug war
Violent non-state actor incidents in Mexico
Attacks in Mexico in 2020